Pərdiqıran (also, Perdigran and Pyardagyran) is a village in the Khachmaz Rayon of Azerbaijan.  The village forms part of the municipality of Susayqışlaq.

References 

Populated places in Khachmaz District